Crazy Hits is the debut studio album by the Crazy Frog, released on 25 July 2005. It is a collection of songs mixed with the Crazy Frog ringtone, including the remix of the song "Axel F" which appeared in the 1984 film Beverly Hills Cop and "Popcorn".

The Crazy Christmas Edition of the album was released on November 25 with an alternate cover and several holiday-themed bonus tracks. This edition charted in the UK at #75. There was also a similar release titled Crazy Winter Hits 2006 with a selection of rarities and remixes, released only in Russia and Ukraine.

Reception
It debuted at number one on the New Zealand Top 40 Album Chart, and reached number five on the UK Albums Chart, number 18 in Australia, and number 19 on the U.S. Billboard 200 Albums Chart.

Despite its mainstream success, it is, as of November 2021, ranked number 203 on Rate Your Music's "Bottom Albums of All-time" list.

Track listing

Main edition
"Intro" (featured in all regions) - 1:02
"Axel F" (featured in all regions) - 2:54
"Popcorn" (featured in all regions) - 3:12
"Whoomp! (There It Is)" (featured in all regions) – 2:52
"1001 Nights" (UK and Australia only)  – 2:55
"Bailando" (UK only) - 3:00
"We Like to Party" (U.S. and Australia only) - 3:27
"Don't You Want Me" (UK and Australia only)  – 2:57
"Dirty Frog" (UK and Australia only) – 3:35
"Magic Melody" (UK and Australia only)– 3:15
"Pump Up The Jam" (featured in all regions)  – 3:09
"In The 80's" (featured in all regions) – 3:32
"Get Ready for This" (U.S. and Australia only) – 3:05
"Pinocchio" (UK only) - 2:58
"Wonderland" (UK and Australia only) – 3:31
"Dallas (Theme)" (UK and Australia only) – 3:15
"Who Let the Frog Out?" (U.S. and Australia only)  – 2:58
"I Like to Move It" (U.S. and Australia only)  – 0:44
"The Pink Panther" (UK only) - 2:35
"Crazy Sounds (Acapella)" (featured in all regions) - 3:08
"Hip Hop Hooray" (U.S. only)
"Y.M.C.A." (U.S. only)
"Axel F" (Video) (featured in all regions)
"Popcorn" (Video) (UK and Australia only)
"Whoomp! (There It Is)" (video) (Australia only)
"Enhanced Section" (With Screensaver, Wallpaper, Photos & Game) (UK and Australia only)

The Crazy Christmas edition
"Intro"
"Jingle Bells"
"Last Christmas"
"U Can't Touch This"
"Axel F"
"Popcorn"
"Whoomp! (There It Is)"
"1001 Nights"
"We Like To Party"
"Don't You Want Me"
"Dirty Frog"
"Magic Melody"
"Pump Up The Jam"
"In The 80's"
"Who Let The Frog Out"
"Wonderland"
"Dallas (Theme)"
"The Pink Panther"
"Get Ready For This"
"I Like To Move It"
"Crazy Sounds (Acapella)"
"Axel F" (Video)
"Popcorn" (Video)
"Enhanced Section" (With Screensaver, Wallpaper and Photos)

The Crazy Winter Hits 2006 edition
 "Jingle Bells" (Single Mix)
 "Chernie Glaza"
 "U Cant Touch This" (Radio Mix)
 "Get Ready For This"
 "Popcorn" (Radio Mix)
 "Who Let The Frog Out?"
 "Last Christmas"
 "Axel F" (Club Mix)
 "Popcorn" (Potatoheadz Mix)
 "We Like To Party" (Hands Up Mix)
 "Axel F" (Bounce Mix)
 "I Like to Move It" (Club Mix)
 "Jingle Bells" (New Club Mix)
 "Crazy Toy Song"

Charts

Weekly charts

Year-end charts

Certifications

References

2005 debut albums
Crazy Frog albums